City Life is the third studio album by the American rhythm and blues and jazz-funk fusion group the Blackbyrds. It was produced by Donald Byrd and includes the popular singles "Happy Music" and "Rock Creek Park." "Happy Music" was first given a limited released as a six-minute remix on 12-inch vinyl for club deejays, then in early 1976 was released on standard 7-inch vinyl. "Rock Creek Park" has been sampled repeatedly by hip hop musicians.

Track listing
"Rock Creek Park"  (Joe Hall, Keith Killgo, Kevin Toney, Orville Saunders, Stephen Johnson)  4:35   	
"Thankful 'Bout Yourself"  (Orville Saunders)  5:11 	
"City Life"  (Kevin Toney)  5:22 	
"All I Ask"  (Kevin Toney)  3:50 	
"Happy Music"  (Donald Byrd)  4:32 	
"Love So Fine"  (Joe Hall)  5:00 	
"Flying High"  (Keith Killgo)  3:29 	
"Hash and Eggs"  (Fonce Mizell, Larry Mizell)  5:06

Personnel 
Donald Byrd – trumpet, flugelhorn, vocals
Joe Hall – bass
Keith Killgo – drums
Orville Saunders – guitar
Kevin Toney – keyboards
Stephen Johnson – saxophone
Merry Clayton – vocals ("Happy Music")

Charts

Album

Singles

References

External links
 The Blackbyrds-City Life at Discogs
 The Blackbyrds-Billboard Albums at AllMusic
 The Blackbyrds-Billboard Singles at AllMusic

1975 albums
The Blackbyrds albums
Fantasy Records albums
Jazz-funk albums